A padayatra is a journey undertaken by politicians or prominent citizens to interact more closely with different parts of society, educate about issues concerning them, and galvanize his or her supporters. Padayatras or foot pilgrimages are also Hindu religious pilgrimages undertaken towards sacred shrines or pilgrimage sites.

Social causes

Mahatma Gandhi originated the padayatra with his famous Salt March to Dandi in 1930. In the winter of 1933–34, Gandhi went on a countrywide padayatra against untouchability. Later, Gandhian Vinoba Bhave also started a padayatra, which was part of his Bhoodan movement in 1951. Starting from the Telangana region, Bhave concluded his padayatra at Bodh Gaya. On 6 January 1983, Chandra Shekhar started his padayatra from Kanyakumari and continued his  journey to Raj Ghat in Delhi till 25 June 1983 to understand the problems of the masses.

Puthan Veetil Rajagopal, in Janadesh 2007, led 25,000 landless peasants on a 28-day march from Gwalior to Delhi. In 1986, Ramon Magsaysay Award winner Rajendra Singh started padayatras through villages of Rajasthan, promoting construction and revival of johads and check dams.

Political purpose

Y. S. Rajasekhara Reddy did a three-month-long padayatra covering , meeting people across several districts of Andhra Pradesh. He led his party to victory in the following general elections held in 2004 to become the chief minister of Andhra Pradesh, which included Telangana also.

The YSRCP chief Y. S. Jaganmohan Reddy launched his Padayatra named ‘Praja Sankalpa Yatra’ at RK Valley in his native Kadapa district after paying homage at the grave of his father. YSR Congress party coined a slogan “Raavali Jagan, Kaavali Jagan” (Jagan should come. We want Jagan) for the foot march that took to him across 125 Assembly segments in 13 districts of the state in 430 days. This Yatra was started on November 6, 2017 and ended on January 9, 2019.

The Indian National Congress, under the leadership of Rahul Gandhi, started Bharat Jodo Yatra, a padyatra on September 7, 2022 in Kanniyakumari at the tip of the Indian peninsula. This foot march will cover about 3,570 km in around five months. It will move across 12 States and two Union Territories, and shall end in Kashmir.

Religious causes
The warkaris from the Maharashtra state of western India practice a regular walk to religious places like Dehu, Alandi and Pandharpur. Ashadhi Ekadashi , Kartiki Ekadashi, Maghi Ekadashi and Chaitra Ekadashi are some of the popular days when pilgrims reach Pandharpur to worship Vithoba.

The Tri-Nation Ahimsa Yatra

Acharya Mahashraman, the 11th Acharya of Terapanth Dharmasangha, started his Tri-Nation Ahimsa Yatra in 2014 to advance the cause of non-violence with the aim of promoting harmony and brotherhood, escalating moral values and movement towards de-addiction. It is an endeavor to awaken a new faith in the infinite power of non-violence. India, Nepal and Bhutan) and 20 states of India.

The Ahimsa Yatra started from the Red Fort, New Delhi, in the year 2014, to Nepal in 2015 covering Uttarakhand, Uttar Pradesh, Bihar, and Jharkhand, Guwahati in 2016 covering West Bengal, Sikkim, Bhutan, Meghalaya, and Nagaland, Kolkata in 2017 covering Orissa, and Andhra Pradesh, Chennai in 2018 covering Tamil Nadu and Kerala, Bengaluru in 2019 and Hyderabad 2020.

On 28 January 2021, Acharya Mahashraman crossed the  mark and created a new history by marching through his holy steps. In today's era full of material resources, where there are so many modes of transport, there are arrangements, still keeping the Indian Sage tradition alive, the great philosopher Acharya Shree Mahashramanji is making a continuous march for public service. Going by the figures, this Yatra is estimated to be 125 times bigger than Mahatma Gandhi's Dandi March and 1.25 times more than the circumference of the earth. It is also speculated that if a person undertakes such a Padyatra, he can travel more than 15 times from the northern end of India to the southern end or from the eastern end to the western end.

He has visited Delhi, Uttar Pradesh, Haryana, Punjab, Gujarat, Rajasthan, Madhya Pradesh, Bihar, Assam, Nagaland, Meghalaya, West Bengal, Jharkhand, Orissa, Tamil Nadu, Karnataka, Kerala, Pondicherry, Andhra Pradesh, Telangana, Maharashtra and Chhattisgarh and traveled to Nepal and Bhutan to inspire people to walk on the path of virtue by training meditation, yoga etc., it also paved the way for the sophistication of their misdeeds. Acharya Shree, who emphasized on change of heart, also trained the public through various seminars, workshops during his visit.With his inspiration, millions of people irrespective of caste, religion and class have accepted the pledge of goodwill, morality and de-addiction in this long non-violence journey.

See also
Selma to Montgomery marches
Suffrage Hikes
Acharya Mahashraman

References 

Politics of India
Gandhism
Social history of India
Hindu pilgrimages
Walking
Political activism